Jeanine Cummins (born December 6, 1974) is an American author of Irish and Puerto Rican heritage.  She has written four books: a memoir titled A Rip in Heaven and three novels, The Outside Boy, The Crooked Branch, and American Dirt. American Dirt was a notable success, selling over 3 million copies in 37 languages. However, it also gained controversy within the American literary community for its perceived cultural exploitation.

Early life 
Cummins was born in Rota, Spain, where her father, Gene, was stationed as a member of the US Navy. Her mother, Kay, was a nurse. Cummins spent her childhood in Gaithersburg, Maryland and attended Towson University, where she majored in English and communications. In 1993 Cummins was a finalist in the Rose of Tralee festival, an international event that is celebrated among Irish communities all over the world; at each festival in Tralee, Ireland, a woman is crowned the Rose.

Career
After university, Cummins spent two years working as a bartender in Belfast, Northern Ireland, before moving back to the United States in 1997 and beginning work at Penguin in New York City. She worked in the publishing industry for 10 years.

Her 2004 memoir, A Rip in Heaven, focuses on the attempted murder of her brother, Tom, and the murder of two of her cousins on the Chain of Rocks Bridge in St. Louis, Missouri, in 1991, when Cummins was 16. She declined offers for film rights to the book. She has said that her cousin Julie's death specifically inspired her to become a writer, as Julie had been "a really gifted writer" and Cummins's role model growing up, and Cummins felt a sense of responsibility to carry on her legacy.

Her next two books were novels that explore Irish history. The Outside Boy (2010) is about Pavee travellers. The Crooked Branch (2013) is about the Great Famine of Ireland. These books were published for the first time in Ireland in 2020.

Cummins' 2020 novel, American Dirt, tells the story of a mother and bookstore owner in Acapulco, Mexico, who attempts to escape to the United States with her son after her husband and her entire family is killed by a drug cartel.  In 2018 the book was sold to Flatiron after a three-day bidding war between nine publishers that resulted in a seven-figure deal. From 2018 until its publication in January 2020, the book was heavily marketed, receiving many positive reviews and a coveted book release day endorsement by Oprah Winfrey as the 83rd book chosen for Oprah's Book Club. The novel eventually sold over 3 million copies, in 37 languages.

Approximately one month prior to release of the book, a negative review from Latina author Myriam Gurba was published online. Then, a week before release of the book, a string of critical reviews was published, including a review in The New York Times. In these reviews and a letter signed by 142 writers, Cummins was accused of exploitation and inaccuracy in her portrayals of both Mexicans and the migrant experience.  Some also claimed that Cummins had previously identified as white but re-branded herself as Latina with the publication of the book, pointing to a line in a 2015 New York Times op-ed in which Cummins stated "I am white." Most did not refer to the entire statement in the op-ed, however, which was about the murder of Cummins's cousins by a group of three black and one white men and included the line "I am white. The grandmother I shared with Julie and Robin was Puerto Rican, and their father is half Lebanese. But in every practical way, my family is mostly white." The controversy around Jeanine's book was used to launch the organization and hashtag #DignidadLiteraria to highlight and address a perceived lack of diversity in the U.S. publishing industry.

On January 30, 2020 Cummins' book tour was cancelled. Flatiron Books' President Bob Miller wrote, "Based on specific threats to booksellers and the author, we believe there exists real peril to their safety." The publisher later clarified that these were not death threats, but rather other threats made against Cummins, against booksellers hosting her, and against moderators participating in the events.

Cummins has indicated that her next book might be set in Puerto Rico.

Family 
Cummins' husband is an Irish immigrant who lived illegally in the U.S. for 10 years. The couple have two daughters, and have also been foster parents.

Works 
 A Rip in Heaven: A Memoir of Murder and Its Aftermath (Berkley, 2004), 
 The Outside Boy (Berkley, 2010), 
 The Crooked Branch (Berkley, 2013), 
 American Dirt (Flatiron, 2020),

References 

Living people
21st-century American novelists
American people of Puerto Rican descent
21st-century American memoirists
American women novelists
21st-century American women writers
American women memoirists
American expatriates in Ireland
Towson University alumni
1974 births